The 2011–12 Scottish Premier League was the fourteenth season of the Scottish Premier League, the highest division of Scottish football, since its inception in 1998. The season started on 23 July 2011 and ended on 13 May 2012.

A total of twelve teams contested the league: eleven sides that competed in the 2010–11 SPL and one club promoted from the First Division. The new entry was First Division champions Dunfermline Athletic, who replaced relegated Hamilton Academical.

Since Scotland climbed from sixteenth to fifteenth place in the UEFA association coefficient rankings at the end of the 2010–11 season, the league re-gained an additional third qualifying round berth for the UEFA Champions League. However, it lost that berth again the following season.  Despite finishing in the second qualifying position for the 2012–13 UEFA Champions League, the eventual liquidation of Rangers allowed Motherwell to take their place in the competition for the first time in the club's history.

On 7 April, Celtic won the title after a 6–0 away win against Kilmarnock at Rugby Park. It was their first title in four years.

Teams

The team ending the 2010–11 season at the bottom of the table, Hamilton Academical, were relegated to the 2011–12 Scottish First Division. Hamilton were replaced by Dunfermline Athletic, champions of the First Division.

Stadia and locations

Personnel and kits

Note: Flags indicate national team as has been defined under FIFA eligibility rules. Players may hold more than one non-FIFA nationality.

Managerial changes

League table

Results

Matches 1–22
Teams play each other twice, once at home, once away

Matches 23–33
Teams play every other team once (either at home or away)

Matches 34–38
After 33 matches, the league splits into two sections of six teams each, with teams playing every other team in their section once (either at home or away). The exact matches are determined upon the league table at the time of the split.

Top six

Bottom six

Season statistics

Top scorers

Top assists

Clean sheets

Awards

Monthly awards

See also
Nine in a row

References

External links
Official website

Scottish Premier League seasons
1
Scot